Popkov is a Russian masculine surname originating from the Russian masculine given name Pop (meaning priest), its feminine counterpart is Popkova. Notable persons with that name include:
Aleksandr Popkov (born 1994), Russian swimmer
 Jurijs Popkovs (born 1961), Latvian footballer and football manager
 Mikhail Popkov (born 1964), Russian serial killer and police officer
Natalya Popkova (born 1988), Russian long-distance runner
 Sergei Popkov (born 1963), Russian football coach
Vera Popkova (1943–2011), Soviet sprinter
 Viktor Popkov (1946–2001), Russian human rights activist and journalist
 Vitaly Popkov (1922–2010), Soviet military aviator
 Vitaly Popkov (cyclist) (born 1983), Ukrainian racing cyclist

See also
House of Popkov

References

Russian-language surnames